Tirebolu (from the Greek word《Τρίπολις》meaning "three cities", named as such by its ancient Greek founders), is a town and district of Giresun Province, Turkey.

Geography
Tirebolu is a small town of 14,303 people located on a hill named Ayana, which rises from the Black Sea shore just to the west of the Harşit River estuary. Tirebolu has a small harbour and a fishing fleet, but the mainstay of the local economy is growing hazelnuts.

History
In his Anabasis, the ancient Greek historian Xenophon (431–360 BC) wrote that Colchians, Drilae, Habibs, and Tiberians had been living in the eastern parts of the Black Sea region during the centuries (BC).

The Naturalis Historia of Pliny the Elder recounts that the ancient fortress city of Tripolis was founded (656 BC) as a trading colony of the Ancient Greek city-state of Miletos, one of nearly 90 along the Black Sea coast.

Tripoli was next part of the Roman Empire, Byzantine Empire, one of the three cities that give the town its name, the others being Andoz (today's Espiye) and Bedrama (or Bedrum) in the Harşit valley. When Alexios Komnenos (later Emperor Alexios I of Trebizond) and his brother David founded the Empire of Trebizond in April 1204, about the time the Fourth Crusade captured and sacked Constantinople, Tripoli became part of this empire. As late as 1404, it was part of the direct territory of the Emperor of Trebizond.

Turkish era 
During the Trapezuntine period (13th century), the Chepni people settled Tirebolu. The ancient city's name was Turkified into the present name of Tirebolu. In 1916 the coast was occupied by Russian troops for two years during the First World War, being restored to Turkish control in 1917.

Villages 

Akıncılar is a village connected to the Tirebolu district of Giresun province.

Arageriş is a village connected to the Tirebolu district of Giresun province.

Arslancık is a village connected to the Tirebolu district of Giresun province.

Aşağıboynuyoğun is a village connected to the Tirebolu district of Giresun province.

Ataköy is a village connected to the Tirebolu district of Giresun province.

Avcılı is a village connected to the Tirebolu district of Giresun province.

Balçıkbelen is a village connected to the Tirebolu district of Giresun province.

Belen is a village connected to the Tirebolu district of Giresun province.

Çamlıköy is a village connected to the Tirebolu district of Giresun province.

Çeğel is a village connected to the Tirebolu district of Giresun province.

Civil is a village connected to the Tirebolu district of Giresun province.

Danışman is a village connected to the Tirebolu district of Giresun province.

Doğancı is a village connected to the Tirebolu district of Giresun province.

Dokuzkonak is a village connected to the Tirebolu district of Giresun province.

Düzköy is a village connected to the Tirebolu district of Giresun province.

Ede  is a village connected to the Tirebolu district of Giresun province.

Eymür is a village connected to the Tirebolu district of Giresun province.

Fatih is a village connected to the Tirebolu district of Giresun province.

Hacıhüseyin is a village connected to the Tirebolu district of Giresun province.

Halaçlı is a village connected to the Tirebolu district of Giresun province.

Harkköy is a village connected to the Tirebolu district of Giresun province.

İğnece is a village connected to the Tirebolu district of Giresun province.

Işıklı is a village connected to the Tirebolu district of Giresun province.

Karaahmetli is a village connected to the Tirebolu district of Giresun province.

Karademir is a village connected to the Tirebolu district of Giresun province.

Kayalar is a village connected to the Tirebolu district of Giresun province.

Ketençukuru is a village connected to the Tirebolu district of Giresun province.

Köseler is a village connected to the Tirebolu district of Giresun province.

Kovancık is a village connected to the Tirebolu district of Giresun province.

Kovanpınar is a village connected to the Tirebolu district of Giresun province.

Kuskunlu is a village connected to the Tirebolu district of Giresun province.

Kuzgun is a village connected to the Tirebolu district of Giresun province.

It is 64 km far from Giresun province and 18 km far from Tirebolu province. The climate of the village is in the area of influence of the Black Sea climate. Village people make their living from nuts. In addition, kiwi and honey production is also made. There is a primary school in the village, but the student is closed due to insufficient and continues with the system of educational transport. Village has drinking water network. There is no sewer network. There is no PTT branch and PTT agency. There is no health centers and health posts. There is electricity, internet and fixed telephone in the village.

Menderes is a village connected to the Tirebolu district of Giresun province.

Mursal is a village connected to the Tirebolu district of Giresun province.

Örenkaya is a village connected to the Tirebolu district of Giresun province.

Ortacami is a village connected to the Tirebolu district of Giresun province.

Ortaköy is a village connected to the Tirebolu district of Giresun province.

Oyraca is a village connected to the Tirebolu district of Giresun province.

Özlü is a village connected to the Tirebolu district of Giresun province.

Sekü is a village connected to the Tirebolu district of Giresun province.

Şenyuva is a village connected to the Tirebolu district of Giresun province.

Şirinköy is a village connected to the Tirebolu district of Giresun province.

Sultanköy is a village connected to the Tirebolu district of Giresun province.

Yağlıkuyumcu is a village connected to the Tirebolu district of Giresun province.

Yalç is a village connected to the Tirebolu district of Giresun province.

Yalıköy is a village connected to the Tirebolu district of Giresun province.

Yaraş is a village connected to the Tirebolu district of Giresun province.

Yeşilpınar is a village connected to the Tirebolu district of Giresun province.

Yılgın is a village connected to the Tirebolu district of Giresun province.

Yukarıboğalı is a village connected to the Tirebolu district of Giresun province.

yukarıboynuyoğun is a village connected to the Tirebolu district of Giresun province.

Yukarıortacami is a village connected to the Tirebolu district of Giresun province.

References

External links

 the municipality
 the district governorate
photos of Tirebolu
and more
Pictures from the castle
Old photo collection

Populated places in Giresun Province
656 BC
Milesian Pontic colonies
Black Sea port cities and towns in Turkey
Fishing communities in Turkey
Populated coastal places in Turkey
Districts of Giresun Province
Towns in Turkey
Greek colonies on the Black Sea coast
7th-century BC establishments